Tom Browne may refer to:

Tom Browne (broadcaster) (born 1945), British broadcaster and actor
Tom Browne (illustrator) (1870–1910), English strip cartoonist, painter and illustrator
Tom Browne (trumpeter) (born 1954), American jazz trumpeter

See also
Tom Brown (disambiguation)
Thomas Browne (disambiguation)